This is a comprehensive listing of all the bird species recorded in Acadia National Park, which is in the U.S. state of Maine. The park's avifauna comprise 363 species according to the National Park Service (NPS) as of February 2022. 

This list is presented in the taxonomic sequence of the Check-list of North and Middle American Birds, 7th edition through the 63rd Supplement, published by the American Ornithological Society (AOS). Common and scientific names are also those of the Check-list, except that the common names of families are from the Clements taxonomy because the AOS list does not include them.

Unless otherwise noted, all are considered to occur regularly in Acadia National Park as permanent residents, summer or winter visitors, or migrants. The tags below are used to designate the abundance of some species. Acadia includes two large parcels on Mt. Desert Island, part of the Schoodic Peninsula on the mainland, part of Isle au Haut, and all or part of several smaller islands. Therefore, some species which are common or abundant on the Maine coast as a whole can be in the "less than common" categories within the Park boundaries.

(R) Rare - "usually seen only a few times each year" (26 species)
(Unc) Uncommon - "likely to be seen monthly in appropriate habitat and season and may be locally common" (16 species)
 (O) Occasional - "occur in a park at least once every few years, varying in numbers, but not necessarily every year" (14 species)
(Unk) Unknown (24 species)
(Hist) Historical - "Species’ historical occurrence in park is documented. Designation of what constitutes “historical” is a judgment call" (27 species)
(NC) Unconfirmed - "Attributed to the park based on weak ("unconfirmed record") or no evidence" (115 species)
(I) Introduced - a species introduced to North America by the actions of man, either directly or indirectly (five species)
(E) Extinct - a recent species that no longer exists (four species)

Ducks, geese, and waterfowl
Order: AnseriformesFamily: Anatidae

The family Anatidae includes the ducks and most duck-like waterfowl, such as geese and swans. These birds are adapted to an aquatic existence with webbed feet, bills which are flattened to a greater or lesser extent, and feathers that are excellent at shedding water due to special oils.

Snow goose, Anser caerulescens (O)
Greater white-fronted goose, Anser albifrons (O)
Brant, Branta bernicla
Canada goose, Branta canadensis 
Tundra swan, Cygnus columbianus (NC)
Wood duck, Aix sponsa 
Blue-winged teal, Spatula discors (Unc)
Northern shoveler, Spatula clypeata (NC)
Gadwall, Mareca strepera (Unk)
Eurasian wigeon, Mareca penelope (Unk)
American wigeon, Mareca americana  (U)
Mallard, Anas platyrhynchos 
American black duck, Anas rubripes 
Northern pintail, Anas acuta (R)
Green-winged teal, Anas crecca 
Canvasback, Aythya valisineria (O)
Redhead, Aythya americana (NC)
Ring-necked duck, Aythya collaris 
Greater scaup, Aythya marila
Lesser scaup, Aythya affinis (NC)
Labrador duck, Camptorhynchus labradorius (E) (NC)
King eider, Somateria spectabilis (NC)
Common eider, Somateria mollissima 
Harlequin duck, Histrionicus histrionicus
Surf scoter, Melanitta perspicillata (NC)
White-winged scoter, Melanitta deglandi (NC)
Black scoter, Melanitta americana (NC)
Long-tailed duck, Clangula hyemalis (NC)
Bufflehead, Bucephala albeola
Common goldeneye, Bucephala clangula
Barrow's goldeneye, Bucephala islandica (NC)
Hooded merganser, Lophodytes cucullatus (Unc)
Common merganser, Mergus merganser 
Red-breasted merganser, Mergus serrator 
Ruddy duck, Oxyura jamaicensis  (NC)

New World quail
Order: GalliformesFamily: Odontophoridae

The New World quails are small, plump terrestrial birds only distantly related to the quails of the Old World, but named for their similar appearance and habits.

Northern bobwhite, Colinus virginianus (NC)

Pheasants, grouse, and allies
Order: GalliformesFamily: Phasianidae

Phasianidae consists of the pheasants and their allies. These are terrestrial species, variable in size but generally plump with broad relatively short wings. Many species are gamebirds or have been domesticated as a food source for humans.

Wild turkey, Meleagris gallopavo (NC)
Ruffed grouse, Bonasa umbellus 
Spruce grouse, Canachites canadensis (R)
Gray partridge, Perdix perdix (I) (Hist)
Ring-necked pheasant, Phasianus colchicus (I) (NC)

Grebes
Order: PodicipediformesFamily: Podicipedidae

Grebes are small to medium-large freshwater diving birds. They have lobed toes and are excellent swimmers and divers. However, they have their feet placed far back on the body, making them quite ungainly on land.

Pied-billed grebe, Podilymbus podiceps (R)
Horned grebe, Podiceps auritus (NC)
Red-necked grebe, Podiceps grisegena (NC)
Eared grebe, Podiceps nigricollis (NC)

Pigeons and doves
Order: ColumbiformesFamily: Columbidae

Pigeons and doves are stout-bodied birds with short necks and short slender bills with a fleshy cere.

Rock pigeon, Columba livia (I) (NC)
Passenger pigeon, Ectopistes migratorius (E)  (NC)
Mourning dove, Zenaida macroura

Cuckoos
Order: CuculiformesFamily: Cuculidae

The family Cuculidae includes cuckoos, roadrunners, and anis. These birds are of variable size with slender bodies, long tails, and strong legs.

Yellow-billed cuckoo, Coccyzus americanus (Unk)
Black-billed cuckoo, Coccyzus erythropthalmus (R)

Nightjars and allies
Order: CaprimulgiformesFamily: Caprimulgidae

Nightjars are medium-sized nocturnal birds that usually nest on the ground. They have long wings, short legs, and very short bills. Most have small feet, of little use for walking, and long pointed wings. Their soft plumage is cryptically colored to resemble bark or leaves.

Common nighthawk, Chordeiles minor 
Chuck-will's-widow, Antrostomus carolinensis (NC)
Eastern whip-poor-will, Antrostomus vociferus

Swifts
Order: ApodiformesFamily: Apodidae

The swifts are small birds which spend the majority of their lives flying. These birds have very short legs and never settle voluntarily on the ground, perching instead only on vertical surfaces. Many swifts have long swept-back wings which resemble a crescent or boomerang.

Chimney swift, Chaetura pelagica

Hummingbirds
Order: ApodiformesFamily: Trochilidae

Hummingbirds are small birds capable of hovering in mid-air due to the rapid flapping of their wings. They are the only birds that can fly backwards.

Ruby-throated hummingbird, Archilochus colubris 
Rufous hummingbird, Selasphorus rufus (NC)

Rails, gallinules, and coots
Order: GruiformesFamily: Rallidae

Rallidae is a large family of small to medium-sized birds which includes the rails, crakes, coots, and gallinules. The most typical family members occupy dense vegetation in damp environments near lakes, swamps, or rivers. In general they are shy and secretive birds, making them difficult to observe. Most species have strong legs and long toes which are well adapted to soft uneven surfaces. They tend to have short, rounded wings and to be weak fliers.

Clapper rail, Rallus crepitans (Hist)
King rail, Rallus elegans (NC)
Virginia rail, Rallus limicola (R)
Sora, Porzana carolina 
Common gallinule, Gallinula galeata (O)
American coot, Fulica americana (Unk)
Purple gallinule, Porphyrio martinicus (Unk)

Cranes
Order: GruiformesFamily: Gruidae

Cranes are large, long-legged, and long-necked birds. Unlike the similar-looking but unrelated herons, cranes fly with necks outstretched, not pulled back. Most have elaborate and noisy courting displays or "dances".

Sandhill crane, Antigone canadensis (NC)

Stilts and avocets
Order: CharadriiformesFamily: Recurvirostridae

Recurvirostridae is a family of large wading birds which includes the avocets and stilts. The avocets have long legs and long up-curved bills. The stilts have extremely long legs and long, thin, straight bills.

American avocet, Recurvirostra americana (Unk)

Oystercatchers
Order: CharadriiformesFamily: Haematopodidae

The oystercatchers are large, obvious and noisy plover-like birds, with strong bills used for smashing or prising open molluscs.

American oystercatcher, Haematopus palliatus (NC)

Plovers and lapwings
Order: CharadriiformesFamily: Charadriidae

The family Charadriidae includes the plovers, dotterels, and lapwings. They are small to medium-sized birds with compact bodies, short thick necks, and long, usually pointed, wings. They are found in open country worldwide, mostly in habitats near water.

Black-bellied plover, Pluvialis squatarola
American golden-plover, Pluvialis dominica (NC)
Killdeer, Charadrius vociferus 
Semipalmated plover, Charadrius semipalmatus (NC)
Piping plover, Charadrius melodus (NC)

Sandpipers and allies
Order: CharadriiformesFamily: Scolopacidae

Scolopacidae is a large diverse family of small to medium-sized shorebirds including the sandpipers, curlews, godwits, shanks, tattlers, woodcocks, snipes, dowitchers, and phalaropes. The majority of these species eat small invertebrates picked out of the mud or soil. Different lengths of legs and bills enable multiple species to feed in the same habitat, particularly on the coast, without direct competition for food.

Upland sandpiper, Bartramia longicauda (R)
Whimbrel, Numenius phaeopus (R)
Eskimo curlew, Numenius borealis (E) (NC)
Long-billed curlew, Numenius americanus (NC)
Hudsonian godwit, Limosa haemastica (Hist)
Ruddy turnstone, Arenaria interpres
Red knot, Calidris canutus (NC)
Stilt sandpiper, Calidris himantopus (Hist)
Sanderling, Calidris alba (NC)
Dunlin, Calidris alpina (NC)
Purple sandpiper, Calidris maritima
Baird's sandpiper, Calidris bairdii (Hist)
Least sandpiper, Calidris minutilla
White-rumped sandpiper, Calidris fuscicollis (Unc)
Pectoral sandpiper, Calidris melanotos (R)
Semipalmated sandpiper, Calidris pusilla
Western sandpiper, Calidris mauri (NC)
Short-billed dowitcher, Limnodromus griseus
Long-billed dowitcher, Limnodromus scolopaceus (NC)
American woodcock, Scolopax minor 
Wilson's snipe, Gallinago delicata  (R)
Spotted sandpiper, Actitis macularia 
Solitary sandpiper, Tringa solitaria
Lesser yellowlegs, Tringa flavipes (Unc)
Willet, Tringa semipalmata  (NC)
Greater yellowlegs, Tringa melanoleuca
Wilson's phalarope, Phalaropus tricolor  (NC)
Red-necked phalarope, Phalaropus lobatus (NC)
Red phalarope, Phalaropus fulicarius (Hist)

Skuas and jaegers
Order: CharadriiformesFamily: Stercorariidae

They are in general medium to large birds, typically with gray or brown plumage, often with white markings on the wings. They have longish bills with hooked tips and webbed feet with sharp claws. They look like large dark gulls, but have a fleshy cere above the upper mandible. They are strong, acrobatic fliers.

Great skua, Stercorarius skua  (NC)
Parasitic jaeger, Stercorarius parasiticus  (NC)
Long-tailed jaeger, Stercorarius longicaudus  (NC)

Auks, murres, and puffins
Order: CharadriiformesFamily: Alcidae

Alcids are superficially similar to penguins due to their black-and-white colors, their upright posture, and some of their habits. However they are only distantly related to the penguins and are able to fly. Auks live on the open sea, only deliberately coming ashore to nest.

Dovekie, Alle alle (NC)
Common murre, Uria aalge (Hist)
Thick-billed murre, Uria lomvia
Razorbill, Alca torda (NC)
Great auk, Pinguinus impennis (E) (Hist)
Black guillemot, Cepphus grylle
Atlantic puffin, Fratercula arctica (NC)

Gulls, terns, and skimmers
Order: CharadriiformesFamily: Laridae

Laridae is a family of medium to large seabirds which includes gulls, terns, kittiwakes, and skimmers. They are typically gray or white, often with black markings on the head or wings. They have longish bills and webbed feet.

Black-legged kittiwake, Rissa tridactyla (NC)
Ivory gull, Pagophila eburnea (NC)
Sabine's gull, Xema sabini (NC)
Bonaparte's gull, Chroicocephalus philadelphia (NC)
Black-headed gull, Chroicocephalus ridibundus (NC)
Little gull, Hydrocoleus minutus (NC)
Laughing gull, Leucophaeus atricilla 
Franklin's gull, Leucophaeus pipixcan (NC)
Ring-billed gull, Larus delawarensis 
Herring gull, Larus argentatus 
Iceland gull, Larus glaucoides (NC)
Lesser black-backed gull, Larus fuscus (NC)
Glaucous gull, Larus hyperboreus (NC)
Great black-backed gull, Larus marinus 
Sooty tern, Onychoprion fuscata (NC)
Least tern, Sternula antillarum (Hist)
Caspian tern, Hydroprogne caspia (NC)
Black tern, Chlidonias niger (NC)
Roseate tern, Sterna dougallii (NC)
Common tern, Sterna hirundo 
Arctic tern, Sterna paradisaea (NC)
Royal tern, Thalasseus maxima (NC)
Black skimmer, Rynchops niger (NC)

Loons
Order: GaviiformesFamily: Gaviidae

Loons are aquatic birds, the size of a large duck, to which they are unrelated. Their plumage is largely gray or black, and they have spear-shaped bills. Loons swim well and fly adequately, but are almost hopeless on land, because their legs are placed towards the rear of the body.

Red-throated loon, Gavia stellata (NC)
Pacific loon, Gavia pacifica (NC)
Common loon, Gavia immer

Albatrosses
Order: ProcellariiformesFamily: Diomedeidae

The albatrosses are amongst the largest of flying birds, and the great albatrosses from the genus Diomedea have the largest wingspans of any extant birds.

Yellow-nosed albatross, Thalassarche chlororhynchos (NC)

Southern storm-petrels
Order: ProcellariiformesFamily: Oceanitidae

The storm-petrels are the smallest seabirds, relatives of the petrels, feeding on planktonic crustaceans and small fish picked from the surface, typically while hovering. The flight is fluttering and sometimes bat-like. Until 2018, this family's three species were included with the other storm-petrels in family Hydrobatidae.

Wilson's storm-petrel, Oceanites oceanicus (NC)

Northern storm-petrels
Order: ProcellariiformesFamily: Hydrobatidae

Though the members of this family are similar in many respects to the southern storm-petrels, including their general appearance and habits, there are enough genetic differences to warrant their placement in a separate family.

Leach's storm-petrel, Hydrobates leucorhous  (NC)

Shearwaters and petrels
Order: ProcellariiformesFamily: Procellariidae

The Procellariids are the main group of medium-sized "true petrels", characterized by united nostrils with medium septum and a long outer functional primary.

Northern fulmar, Fulmarus glacialis (NC)
Cory's shearwater, Calonectris diomedea (NC)
Great shearwater, Ardenna gravis (NC)
Sooty shearwater, Ardenna griseus (NC)
Manx shearwater, Puffinus puffinus (NC)

Frigatebirds
Order: SuliformesFamily: Fregatidae

Frigatebirds are large seabirds usually found over tropical oceans. They are large, black, or black-and-white, with long wings and deeply forked tails. The males have colored inflatable throat pouches. They do not swim or walk and cannot take off from a flat surface. Having the largest wingspan-to-body-weight ratio of any bird, they are essentially aerial, able to stay aloft for more than a week.

Magnificent frigatebird, Fregata magnificens (NC)

Boobies and gannets
Order: SuliformesFamily: Sulidae

The sulids comprise the gannets and boobies. Both groups are medium-large coastal seabirds that plunge-dive for fish.

Northern gannet, Morus bassanus (NC)

Cormorants and shags
Order: SuliformesFamily: Phalacrocoracidae

Cormorants are medium-to-large aquatic birds, usually with mainly dark plumage and areas of colored skin on the face. The bill is long, thin, and sharply hooked. Their feet are four-toed and webbed.

Great cormorant, Nannopterum auritum (NC)
Double-crested cormorant, Nannopterum auritum

Pelicans
Order: PelecaniformesFamily: Pelecanidae

Pelicans are very large water birds with a distinctive pouch under their beak. Like other birds in the order Pelecaniformes, they have four webbed toes.

American white pelican, Pelecanus erythrorhynchos (NC)

Herons, egrets, and bitterns
Order: PelecaniformesFamily: Ardeidae

The family Ardeidae contains the herons, egrets, and bitterns. Herons and egrets are medium to large wading birds with long necks and legs. Bitterns tend to be shorter necked and more secretive. Members of Ardeidae fly with their necks retracted, unlike other long-necked birds such as storks, ibises, and spoonbills.

American bittern, Botaurus lentiginosus 
Least bittern, Ixobrychus exilis (R)
Great blue heron, Ardea herodias 
Great egret, Ardea alba 
Snowy egret, Egretta thula (R)
Little blue heron, Egretta caerulea (O)
Tricolored heron, Egretta tricolor (O)
Cattle egret, Bubulcus ibis (NC)
Green heron, Butorides virescens (Unc)
Black-crowned night-heron, Nycticorax nycticorax (O) 
Yellow-crowned night-heron, Nyctanassa violacea (O)

Ibises and spoonbills
Order: PelecaniformesFamily: Threskiornithidae

The family Threskiornithidae includes the ibises and spoonbills. They have long, broad wings. Their bodies tend to be elongated, the neck more so, with rather long legs. The bill is also long, decurved in the case of the ibises, straight and distinctively flattened in the spoonbills.

Glossy ibis, Plegadis falcinellus (Unk)

New World vultures
Order: CathartiformesFamily: Cathartidae

The New World vultures are not closely related to Old World vultures, but superficially resemble them because of convergent evolution. Like the Old World vultures, they are scavengers. However, unlike Old World vultures, which find carcasses by sight, New World vultures have a good sense of smell with which they locate carcasses.

Turkey vulture, Cathartes aura

Osprey
Order: AccipitriformesFamily: Pandionidae

Pandionidae is a family of fish-eating birds of prey, possessing a very large, powerful hooked beak for tearing flesh from their prey, strong legs, powerful talons, and keen eyesight. The family is monotypic.

Osprey, Pandion haliaetus

Hawks, eagles, and kites
Order: AccipitriformesFamily: Accipitridae

Accipitridae is a family of birds of prey which includes hawks, eagles, kites, harriers, and Old World vultures. These birds have very large powerful hooked beaks for tearing flesh from their prey, strong legs, powerful talons, and keen eyesight.

Golden eagle, Aquila chrysaetos (O)
Northern harrier, Circus hudonius  (U)
Sharp-shinned hawk, Accipiter striatus 
Cooper's hawk, Accipiter cooperii  (U)
Northern goshawk, Accipiter gentilis  (U)
Bald eagle, Haliaeetus leucocephalus 
Red-shouldered hawk, Buteo lineatus (O)
Broad-winged hawk, Buteo platypterus 
Swainson's hawk, Buteo swainsoni (NC)
Red-tailed hawk, Buteo jamaicensis 
Rough-legged hawk, Buteo lagopus (U)

Barn-owlsOrder: StrigiformesFamily: Tytonidae

Barn-owls are medium to large owls with large heads and characteristic heart-shaped faces. They have long strong legs with powerful talons.

Barn owl, Tyto alba (Hist)

OwlsOrder: StrigiformesFamily: Strigidae

Typical owls are small to large solitary nocturnal birds of prey. They have large forward-facing eyes and ears, a hawk-like beak, and a conspicuous circle of feathers around each eye called a facial disk.

Eastern screech-owl, Megascops asio (Unk)
Great horned owl, Bubo virginianus (Unc)
Snowy owl, Bubo scandiacus (R)
Northern hawk owl, Surnia ulula (O)
Barred owl, Strix varia (Unc)
Great gray owl, Strix nebulosa (NC)
Long-eared owl, Asio otus (R)
Short-eared owl, Asio flammeus  (Hist)
Boreal owl, Aegolius funereus (NC)
Northern saw-whet owl, Aegolius acadicus (Unc)

KingfishersOrder: CoraciiformesFamily: Alcedinidae

Kingfishers are medium-sized birds with large heads, long pointed bills, short legs, and stubby tails.

Belted kingfisher, Megaceryle alcyon

WoodpeckersOrder: PiciformesFamily: Picidae

Woodpeckers are small to medium-sized birds with chisel-like beaks, short legs, stiff tails, and long tongues used for capturing insects. Some species have feet with two toes pointing forward and two backward, while several species have only three toes. Many woodpeckers have the habit of tapping noisily on tree trunks with their beaks.

Red-headed woodpecker, Melanerpes erythrocephalus (NC)
Red-bellied woodpecker, Melanerpes carolinus (Unk)
Yellow-bellied sapsucker, Sphyrapicus varius 
American three-toed woodpecker, Picoides dorsalis (Unk)
Black-backed woodpecker, Picoides arcticus (O)
Downy woodpecker, Dryobates pubescens 
Hairy woodpecker, Dryobates villosus 
Northern flicker, Colaptes auratus 
Pileated woodpecker, Dryocopus pileatus

Falcons and caracarasOrder: FalconiformesFamily: Falconidae

Falconidae is a family of diurnal birds of prey, notably the falcons and caracaras. They differ from hawks, eagles, and kites in that they kill with their beaks instead of their talons.

American kestrel, Falco sparverius 
Merlin, Falco columbarius
Gyrfalcon, Falco rusticolus (Unk)
Peregrine falcon, Falco peregrinus (Unc)

Tyrant flycatchersOrder: PasseriformesFamily: Tyrannidae

Tyrant flycatchers are Passerine birds which occur throughout North and South America. They superficially resemble the Old World flycatchers, but are more robust and have stronger bills. They do not have the sophisticated vocal capabilities of the songbirds. Most, but not all, are rather plain. As the name implies, most are insectivorous.

Ash-throated flycatcher, Myiarchus cinerascens (NC)
Great crested flycatcher, Myiarchus crinitus 
Western kingbird, Tyrannus verticalis (NC)
Eastern kingbird, Tyrannus tyrannus 
Scissor-tailed flycatcher, Tyrannus forficatus (NC)
Olive-sided flycatcher, Contopus cooperi (Unc)
Eastern wood-pewee, Contopus virens 
Yellow-bellied flycatcher, Empidonax flaviventris 
Alder flycatcher, Empidonax alnorum 
Willow flycatcher, Empidonax traillii (R)
Least flycatcher, Empidonax minimus 
Eastern phoebe, Sayornis phoebe 
Say's phoebe, Sayornis saya (NC)
Vermilion flycatcher, Pyrocephalus rubinus (NC)

Vireos, shrike-babblers, and erpornisOrder: PasseriformesFamily: Vireonidae

The vireos are a group of small to medium-sized passerine birds restricted to the New World. They are typically greenish in color and resemble wood-warblers apart from their heavier bills.

White-eyed vireo, Vireo griseus (Unk)
Yellow-throated vireo, Vireo flavifrons (O)
Blue-headed vireo, Vireo solitarius 
Philadelphia vireo, Vireo philadelphicus (R)
Warbling vireo, Vireo gilvus (O)
Red-eyed vireo, Vireo olivaceus

ShrikesOrder: PasseriformesFamily: Laniidae

Shrikes are passerine birds known for their habit of catching other birds and small animals and impaling the uneaten portions of their bodies on thorns. A shrike's beak is hooked, like that of a typical bird of prey.

Loggerhead shrike, Lanius ludovicianus (Hist)
Northern shrike, Lanius borealis (NC)

Crows, jays, and magpiesOrder: PasseriformesFamily: Corvidae

The family Corvidae includes crows, ravens, jays, choughs, magpies, treepies, nutcrackers, and ground jays. Corvids are above average in size among the Passeriformes, and some of the larger species show high levels of intelligence.

Canada jay, Perisoreus canadensis (R)
Blue jay, Cyanocitta cristata 
American crow, Corvus brachyrhynchos 
Common raven, Corvus corax

Tits, chickadees, and titmiceOrder: PasseriformesFamily: Paridae

The Paridae are mainly small stocky woodland species with short stout bills. Some have crests. They are adaptable birds, with a mixed diet including seeds and insects.

Black-capped chickadee, Poecile atricapilla 
Boreal chickadee, Poecile hudsonica (Unc)
Tufted titmouse, Baeolophus bicolor (NC)

LarksOrder: PasseriformesFamily: Alaudidae

Larks are small terrestrial birds with often extravagant songs and display flights. Most larks are fairly dull in appearance. Their food is insects and seeds.

Horned lark, Eremophila alpestris (Unc)

SwallowsOrder: PasseriformesFamily: Hirundinidae

The family Hirundinidae is adapted to aerial feeding. They have a slender streamlined body, long pointed wings, and a short bill with a wide gape. The feet are adapted to perching rather than walking, and the front toes are partially joined at the base.

Bank swallow, Riparia riparia (NC)
Tree swallow, Tachycineta bicolor 
Northern rough-winged swallow, Stelgidopteryx serripennis (Unk)
Purple martin, Progne subis (Unk)
Barn swallow, Hirundo rustica 
Cliff swallow, Petrochelidon pyrrhonota

KingletsOrder: PasseriformesFamily: Regulidae

The kinglets are a small family of birds which resemble the titmice. They are very small insectivorous birds in the genus Regulus. The adults have colored crowns, giving rise to their name.

Ruby-crowned kinglet, Corthylio calendula
Golden-crowned kinglet, Regulus satrapa 

WaxwingsOrder: PasseriformesFamily: Bombycillidae

The waxwings are a group of birds with soft silky plumage and unique red tips to some of the wing feathers. In the Bohemian and cedar waxwings, these tips look like sealing wax and give the group its name. These are arboreal birds of northern forests. They live on insects in summer and berries in winter.

Bohemian waxwing, Bombycilla garrulus (Unk)
Cedar waxwing, Bombycilla cedrorum

NuthatchesOrder: PasseriformesFamily: Sittidae

Nuthatches are small woodland birds. They have the unusual ability to climb down trees head first, unlike other birds which can only go upwards. Nuthatches have big heads, short tails, and powerful bills and feet.

Red-breasted nuthatch, Sitta canadensis 
White-breasted nuthatch, Sitta carolinensis

TreecreepersOrder: PasseriformesFamily: Certhiidae

Treecreepers are small woodland birds, brown above and white below. They have thin pointed down-curved bills, which they use to extricate insects from bark. They have stiff tail feathers, like woodpeckers, which they use to support themselves on vertical trees.

Brown creeper, Certhia americana

GnatcatchersOrder: PasseriformesFamily: Polioptilidae

These dainty birds resemble Old World warblers in their structure and habits, moving restlessly through the foliage seeking insects. The gnatcatchers are mainly soft bluish gray in color and have the typical insectivore's long sharp bill. Many species have distinctive black head patterns (especially males) and long, regularly cocked, black-and-white tails.

Blue-gray gnatcatcher, Polioptila caerulea (R)

WrensOrder: PasseriformesFamily: Troglodytidae

Wrens are small and inconspicuous birds, except for their loud songs. They have short wings and thin down-turned bills. Several species often hold their tails upright. All are insectivorous.

Bewick's wren, Thryomanes bewickii (Hist)
Carolina wren, Thryothorus ludovicianus (NC)
House wren, Troglodytes aedon  (Hist)
Winter wren, Troglodytes hiemalis 
Sedge wren, Cistothorus platensis (R)
Marsh wren, Cistothorus palustris (R)

Old World flycatchersOrder: PasseriformesFamily: Muscicapidae

The Old World flycatchers are a large family of small passerine birds mostly restricted to the Old World. These are mainly small arboreal insectivores, many of which, as the name implies, take their prey on the wing.

Northern wheatear, Oenanthe oenanthe (Hist)

Mockingbirds and thrashersOrder: PasseriformesFamily: Mimidae

The mimids are a family of passerine birds which includes thrashers, mockingbirds, tremblers, and the New World catbirds. These birds are notable for their vocalization, especially their remarkable ability to mimic a wide variety of birds and other sounds heard outdoors. The species tend towards dull grays and browns in their appearance.

Gray catbird, Dumetella carolinensis 
Brown thrasher, Toxostoma rufum 
Northern mockingbird, Mimus polyglottos (Hist)

StarlingsOrder: PasseriformesFamily: Sturnidae

Starlings are small to medium-sized Old World passerine birds with strong feet. Their flight is strong and direct and most are very gregarious. Their preferred habitat is fairly open country, and they eat insects and fruit. The plumage of several species is dark with a metallic sheen.

European starling, Sturnus vulgaris (I) (NC)

Thrushes and alliesOrder: PasseriformesFamily: Turdidae

The thrushes are a group of passerine birds that occur mainly but not exclusively in the Old World. They are plump, soft plumaged, small to medium-sized insectivores or sometimes omnivores, often feeding on the ground. Many have attractive songs.

Eastern bluebird, Sialia sialis (Unc)
Townsend's solitaire, Myadestes townsendi (NC)
Veery, Catharus fuscescens 
Gray-cheeked thrush, Catharus minimus (R)
Bicknell's thrush, Catharus bicknelli (NC)
Swainson's thrush, Catharus ustulatus 
Hermit thrush, Catharus guttatus 
Wood thrush, Hylocichla mustelina (Unc)
American robin, Turdus migratorius 
Varied thrush, Ixoreus naevius (NC)

Old World sparrowsOrder: PasseriformesFamily: Passeridae

Old World sparrows are small passerine birds. In general, sparrows tend to be small plump brownish or grayish birds with short tails and short powerful beaks. Sparrows are seed eaters, but they also consume small insects.

House sparrow, Passer domesticus (I) (NC)

Wagtails and pipitsOrder: PasseriformesFamily: Motacillidae

Motacillidae is a family of small passerine birds with medium to long tails. They include the wagtails, longclaws and pipits. They are slender ground-feeding insectivores of open country.

American pipit, Anthus rubescens

Finches, euphonias, and alliesOrder: PasseriformesFamily: Fringillidae

Finches are seed-eating passerine birds, that are small to moderately large and have a strong beak, usually conical and in some species very large. All have twelve tail feathers and nine primaries. These birds have a bouncing flight with alternating bouts of flapping and gliding on closed wings, and most sing well.

Evening grosbeak, Coccothraustes vespertinus  (Hist)
Pine grosbeak, Pinicola enucleator  (Hist)
House finch, Haemorhous mexicanus (Native to the southwestern U.S.; introduced to the east)
Purple finch, Haemorhous purpureus 
Common redpoll, Acanthis flammea (Hist)
Hoary redpoll, Acanthis hornemanni (NC)
Red crossbill, Loxia curvirostra 
White-winged crossbill, Loxia leucoptera (Unk)
Pine siskin, Spinus pinus 
American goldfinch, Spinus tristis

Longspurs and snow buntingsOrder: PasseriformesFamily: Calcariidae

The Calcariidae are a group of passerine birds that were traditionally grouped with the New World sparrows, but differ in a number of respects and are usually found in open grassy areas.

Lapland longspur, Calcarius lapponicus (NC)
Snow bunting, Plectrophenax nivalis

New World sparrowsOrder: PasseriformesFamily: Passerellidae

Until 2017, these species were considered part of the family Emberizidae. Most of the species are known as sparrows, but these birds are not closely related to the Old World sparrows which are in the family Passeridae. Many of these have distinctive head patterns.

Grasshopper sparrow, Ammodramus savannarum  (NC)
Lark sparrow, Chondestes grammacus (Hist)
Lark bunting, Calamospiza melanocorys (Hist)
Chipping sparrow, Spizella passerina 
Clay-colored sparrow, Spizella pallida (Hist)
Field sparrow, Spizella pusilla (R)
Fox sparrow, Passerella iliaca  (Hist)
American tree sparrow, Spizelloides arborea
Dark-eyed junco, Junco hyemalis
White-crowned sparrow, Zonotrichia leucophrys (Hist)
Harris's sparrow, Zonotrichia querula (NC)
White-throated sparrow, Zonotrichia albicollis 
Vesper sparrow, Pooecetes gramineus (Unk)
LeConte's sparrow, Ammospiza leconteii (NC)
Nelson's sparrow, Ammospiza nelsoni 
Savannah sparrow, Passerculus sandwichensis 
Song sparrow, Melospiza melodia 
Lincoln's sparrow, Melospiza lincolnii (R)
Swamp sparrow, Melospiza georgiana 
Green-tailed towhee, Pipilo chlorurus (NC)
Spotted towhee, Pipilo maculatus  (NC)
Eastern towhee, Pipilo erythrophthalmus 

Yellow-breasted chatOrder: PasseriformesFamily: Icteriidae

This species was historically placed in the wood-warblers (Parulidae) but nonetheless most authorities were unsure if it belonged there. It was placed in its own family in 2017.

Yellow-breasted chat, Icteria virens (Hist)

Troupials and alliesOrder: PasseriformesFamily: Icteridae

The icterids are a group of small to medium-sized, often colorful passerine birds restricted to the New World and include the grackles, New World blackbirds, and New World orioles. Most species have black as a predominant plumage color, often enlivened by yellow, orange, or red.

Yellow-headed blackbird, Xanthocephalus xanthocephalus (NC)
Bobolink, Dolichonyx oryzivorus  (NC)
Eastern meadowlark, Sturnella magna (R)
Orchard oriole, Icterus spurius  (NC)
Bullock's oriole, Icterus bullockii (NC)
Baltimore oriole, Icterus galbula 
Red-winged blackbird, Agelaius phoeniceus 
Brown-headed cowbird, Molothrus ater 
Rusty blackbird, Euphagus carolinus 
Brewer's blackbird, Euphagus cyanocephalus (NC)
Common grackle, Quiscalus quiscula

New World warblersOrder: PasseriformesFamily: Parulidae

The wood-warblers are a group of small often colorful passerine birds restricted to the New World. Most are arboreal, but some are more terrestrial. Most members of this family are insectivores.

Ovenbird, Seiurus aurocapilla
Worm-eating warbler, Helmitheros vermivorum (NC)
Louisiana waterthrush, Parkesia motacilla (NC)
Northern waterthrush, Parkesia noveboracensis (Unc)
Golden-winged warbler, Vermivora chrysoptera
Blue-winged warbler, Vermivora cyanoptera (Unk)
Black-and-white warbler, Mniotilta varia
Prothonotary warbler, Protonotaria citrea (NC)
Tennessee warbler, Leiothlypis peregrina
Orange-crowned warbler, Leiothlypis celata (Unk)
Nashville warbler, Leiothlypis ruficapilla
Connecticut warbler, Oporornis agilis (Unk)
Mourning warbler, Geothlypis philadelphia (Unc)
Kentucky warbler, Geothlypis formosa (Unk)
Common yellowthroat, Geothlypis trichas
Hooded warbler, Setophaga citrina (Unk)
American redstart, Setophaga ruticilla
Cape May warbler, Setophaga tigrina
Cerulean warbler, Setophaga cerulea (Hist)
Northern parula, Setophaga americana
Magnolia warbler, Setophaga magnolia
Bay-breasted warbler, Setophaga castanea
Blackburnian warbler, Setophaga fusca
Yellow warbler, Setophaga petechia
Chestnut-sided warbler, Setophaga pensylvanica
Blackpoll warbler, Setophaga striata
Black-throated blue warbler, Setophaga caerulescens
Palm warbler, Setophaga palmarum
Pine warbler, Setophaga pinus (Hist)
Yellow-rumped warbler, Setophaga coronata
Yellow-throated warbler, Setophaga dominica (Unk)
Prairie warbler, Setophaga discolor (Unk)
Townsend's warbler, Setophaga townsendi (R)
Black-throated green warbler, Setophaga virens
Canada warbler, Cardellina canadensis
Wilson's warbler, Cardellina pusilla

Cardinals and alliesOrder: PasseriformesFamily''': Cardinalidae

The cardinals are a family of robust, seed-eating birds with strong bills. They are typically associated with open woodland. The sexes usually have distinct plumages.

Summer tanager, Piranga rubra (NC)
Scarlet tanager, Piranga olivacea (R)
Northern cardinal, Cardinalis cardinalis (NC)
Rose-breasted grosbeak, Pheucticus ludovicianus 
Blue grosbeak, Passerina caerulea (NC)
Lazuli bunting, Passerina amoena (NC)
Indigo bunting, Passerina cyanea (R)
Painted bunting, Passerina ciris (NC)
Dickcissel, Spiza americana''  (NC)

References

See also
List of birds
List of birds of Maine
Lists of birds by region
List of North American birds

Birds, Acadia National Park
Maine, Acadia
Acadia National Park